Pozzillo Lake is a lake in the Province of Enna, Sicily, southern Italy. Located in the Erean Mountains chain, it is the largest artificial basin in the island.  The lake is located mostly in the comune of Regalbuto, but also partially in Agira.  The lake was formed when a dam was built in 1959 at the north eastern end of the lake.

Lakes of Sicily
Regalbuto

References